The 2012 Sun Devils football team represented Arizona State University in the 2012 NCAA Division I FBS football season. They were led by first year coach Todd Graham and played their home games at Sun Devil Stadium. They were a member of the South Division of the Pac-12 Conference. They finished the season 8–5, 5–4 in Pac-12 play to finish in a tie for second place in the South Division. They were invited to the Kraft Fight Hunger Bowl where they defeated Navy.

Previous season

The 2011 Sun Devils finished 6–7 last season (4–5 in the Pac-12) in Dennis Erickson's fifth and final season as head coach. They were invited to the Las Vegas Bowl, where they were defeated by Boise State. Erickson was fired following the season, and Arizona State hired Todd Graham to replace him.

Players drafted

Reference:

Schedule

Game summaries

Northern Arizona

Marion Grice ran for 3 touchdowns and Taylor Kelly was efficient in his first start as Arizona State opened the Todd Graham era with a 63–6 rout over Northern Arizona on a Thursday night. The Sun Devils dominated NAU from the opening kickoff, forcing three turnovers and rushing for 5 touchdowns while building a 42–0 halftime lead. Cameron Marshall had 2 of ASU's 7 rushing touchdowns, both came in the first quarter. The Sun Devils had over 550 yards of offense while scoring the most points since 2005 by an ASU team.

Illinois

"Taylor Kelly completed 18 of 24 passes for 249 yards and a touchdown, and Arizona State rolled past Illinois 45–14 on Saturday night to improve to 2–0 under new coach Todd Graham." True Freshman Carlos Mendoza had 2 INTs for ASU starting in place of injured linebacker Brandon Magee who was out with a concussion.  Arizona State also completed their first 14 passes, 10 by Taylor Kelly and 4 by Michael Eubank. Chris Coyle finished with a career-high 10 receptions for 131 yards and 2 TDs.  ILL was without starting QB Nathan Scheelhaase because of an ankle injury suffered a week earlier.

Missouri

For the second week in a row the Sun Devils faced a backup QB as Jonathan Franklin was ruled out after being announced in the starting lineup.  Instead redshirt Freshman Corbin Berkstresser took the field. Missouri jumped out to a 17-point lead that they held until the fourth quarter in front of a sellout crowd of 71,004, the school's first for a non-conference game since Notre Dame in 1984. After a horrible start ASU QB Taylor Kelly rallied the team in the second half going 9 of 11 and passing for 116 yards. The sophomore also rushed for 59 net yards.  The game ended with an interception by Kelly as he tried to hit an open Jamal Miles for what would have been the go ahead touchdown.  “We beat ourselves with turnovers tonight,” Kelly said. “We have to protect the football a lot better next week.” Josh Hubner had a career-best 62-yard punt in the game.

Utah

1st quarter scoring: ASU – Rashad Ross 38-yard pass from Taylor Kelly (Alex Garoutte kick; ASU – L. Govan 1-yard run (Garoutte kick; ASU – Marion Grice 10-yard pass from Kelly (Garoutte kick)

2nd quarter scoring: UTAH – Karl Williams 2-yard pass from Jon Hays (Colem Petersen kick); ASU – Garoutte 22-yard field goal; ASU – Marshall 13-yard pass from Kelly (Garoutte kick)

3rd quarter scoring: ASU – Garoutte 22-yard field goal

4th quarter scoring: ASU – Garoutte 43-yard field goal

California

California leads the series 17–14 with the Golden Bears winning the last meeting 47–38 in Tempe.

1st quarter scoring: ASU – Darwin Rogers 1-yard pass from Taylor Kelly (Alex Garoutte kick).

2nd quarter scoring: CAL – Isi Sofele 24-yard run (Vincenzo D'Amato kick); ASU– Garoutte 28-yard field goal; ASU – Kevin Ozier 9-yard pass from Kelly (Garoutte kick).

3rd quarter scoring: ASU – Garoutte 33-yard field goal; CAL – D'Amato 35-yard field goal.

4th quarter scoring: CAL – Keenan Allen 10-pass from Zach Maynard (D'Amato Kick); ASU – Ozier 22-yard pass from Kelly (Garoutte Kick)

Colorado

Arizona State starts slow only to dominate in the second half outscoring Colorado 31–0.  Linebacker Brandon Magee was quoted before the game that he wanted to pitch a shutout in Colorado on National TV. CU used this as bulletin board material in the days before the game.  Taylor Kelly threw for a career-high 5 touchdown passes.

1st quarter scoring: ASU – Marion Grice 37 yard pass from Taylor Kelly

2nd quarter scoring: CU – Tony Jones 2 yard run (Oliver Kick); ASU – D.J. Foster 34 yard pass from Taylor Kelly (Garoutte kick); ASU – Marion Grice 16 yard pass from Taylor Kelly (Garoutte kick); CU – Nick Kasa 20 yard pass from Jordan Webb (Oliver Kick); CU – Will Oliver 37 yard kick.

3rd quarter scoring: ASU – Rashad Ross 100 yard kickoff return (Garoutte kick); ASU – Marion Grice 20 yard pass from Taylor Kelly (Garoutte kick).

4th quarter scoring: ASU – Jon Mora 38 yard kick; ASU – Richard Smith 31 yard pass from Taylor Kelly (Mora kick); ASU – Cameron Marshall 14 yard run (Garoutte kick)

Oregon

1st quarter scoring: ASU – Kevin Ozier 28 Yd Pass From Taylor Kelly (Alex Garoutte Kick); ORE – Kenjon Barner 71 Yd Run (Jackson Rice Pass To Rob Beard For Two-Point Conversion); ORE – Bralon Addison 6 Yd Pass From Marcus Mariota (Beard Kick); ORE – Marcus Mariota 2 Yd Pass From Bryan Bennett (Beard Kick)

2nd quarter scoring: ORE – Kenjon Barner 1 Yd Run (Beard Kick); ORE – Marcus Mariota 86 Yd Run (Beard Kick); ORE – Kenjon Barner 1 Yd Run (Beard Kick)

3rd quarter scoring: No scoring.

4th quarter scoring: ASU – Anthony Jones 36 Yd Interception Return (Garoutte Kick); ASU – D. J. Foster 23 Yd Pass From Michael Eubank (Garoutte Kick)

UCLA

UCLA leads the series, 17–10–1. Last season, UCLA downed ASU 29–28 at the Rose Bowl, a last second field goal attempt by the Sun Devils was just off the mark.

1st quarter scoring: ASU – Kevin Ozier 7-yard pass from Taylor Kelly (Alex Garoutte kick); ASU – Marion Grice 2-yard run (Garoutte kick); UCLA – Johnathan Franklin 3-yard run (Ka'imi Fairbairn kick); UCLA – Devin Fuller 15-yard pass from Brett Hundley (Fairbairn kick).

2nd quarter scoring: 
ASU – Jon Mora 36-yard field goal; UCLA – Franklin 5-yard run (Fairbairn kick).

3rd quarter scoring: 
ASU – Mora 31-yard field goal; UCLA – Damien Thigpen 65-yard pass from Hundley (Fairbairn kick); ASU – Grice 20-yard pass from Kelly (Two-point pass conversion failed); UCLA – Joseph Fauria 4-yard pass from Hundley (Fairbairn kick).

4th quarter scoring: ASU – Grice 8-yard pass from Kelly (Garoutte kick); UCLA – Damien Thigpen 20-yard Pass From Hundley (Fairbairn kick); ASU – Mora 22-yard field goal; ASU – D.J. Foster 7-yard pass from Kelly (Garoutte kick); UCLA – Fairbairn 33-yard field goal.

Oregon State

1st quarter scoring: ASU – Junior Onyeali 1 yard fumble recovery (Garoutte kick); OSU – Trevor Romaine 41 yard kick; ASU – Cameron Marshall 1 yard run (Garoutte kick); OSU – Markus Wheaton 50 yard pass from Cody Vaz (Romaine kick); ASU – Kevin Ayers punt block for safety.

2nd quarter scoring: ASU – Jon Mora 31 yard kick; OSU – Terron Ward 53 yard run; OSU – Trevor Romaine 45 yard kick.

3rd quarter scoring: OSU – Markus Wheaton 17 yard pass from Cody Vaz (Romaine kick); OSU – Trevor Romaine 33 yard kick.

4th quarter scoring: OSU – Brandin Cooks 49 yard pass from Cody Vaz (Romaine kick); ASU – Marion Grice 2 yard pass from Taylor Kelly (Garoutte kick)

USC

1st quarter scoring: ASU – Chris Coyle 34-yard pass from Taylor Kelly (Alex Garoutte kick); USC – Marqise Lee 80-yard pass from Matt Barkley (Andre Heidari kick).

2nd quarter scoring: ASU – Alden Darby 70-yard interception return (Garoutte kick); USC – Xavier Grimble 4-yard pass from Barkley (Heidari kick).

3rd quarter scoring: ASU – Jon Mora 28-yard field goal; USC – Curtis McNeal 5-yard run (Heidari kick); USC – McNeal 22-yard pass from Barkley (Heidari kick).

4th quarter scoring: USC – Heidari 26-yard field goal; USC – McNeal 27-yard run (Heidari kick).

Washington State

Quarterbacks Taylor Kelly and Michael Eubank accounted for six touchdowns Saturday, and Arizona State became bowl eligible with a 46–7 rout over Washington State that ended the Sun Devils' four-game losing streak.

1st quarter scoring: ASU – Jon Mora 21-yard field goal; ASU – Rashard Ross 15-yard pass from Taylor Kelly (Cameron Marshall run for two-point conversion); ASU – Chris Coyle-18 yard pass from Kelly (Alex Garoutte kick).

2nd quarter scoring: ASU – Marion Grice 17-yard pass from Taylor Kelly (Garoutte kick); ASU – Coyle 29-yard pass from Kelly (Garoutte kick).

3rd quarter scoring: ASU – Michael Eubank 1-yard run (Garoutte kick); ASU – Rashad Ross 31-yard pass from Kelly (Garoutte kick).

4th quarter scoring: WSU – Kristoff Williams 54-yard pass from Connor Halliday (Andrew Furney kick).

Arizona

Source: ESPN

Roster
Does not reflect actual depth chart

Rankings

After the Season

Players Drafted

Reference:

References

Arizona State
Arizona State Sun Devils football seasons
Redbox Bowl champion seasons
Arizona State Sun Devils football